Naoko Sawamatsu successfully defended her title by defeating Florencia Labat 7–5, 7–5 in the final.

Seeds

Draw

Finals

Top half

Bottom half

References

External links
 Official results archive (ITF)

Singapore singles
WTA Singapore Open
1994 in Singaporean sport